Harry Verdon (7 October 1909 – 4 June 1996) was an  Australian rules footballer who played with St Kilda and Fitzroy in the Victorian Football League (VFL).

Notes

External links 
		

1909 births
1996 deaths
Australian rules footballers from Victoria (Australia)
St Kilda Football Club players
Fitzroy Football Club players